The Roman Catholic Diocese of Coroico is a diocese located in the city of Coroico in the Ecclesiastical province of La Paz in Bolivia.

History
 November 7, 1958: Established as Territorial Prelature of Coroico from the Metropolitan Archdiocese of La Paz
 July 28, 1983: Promoted as Diocese of Coroico

Bishops

Ordinaries (in reverse chronological order)
 Bishops of Coroico (Roman rite)
 Bishop Juan Carlos Huaygua Oropeza, O.P. (2022.12.03 – present)
 Bishop Juan Vargas Aruquipa (1997.08.20 – 2022.12.03)
 Bishop Tomás Roberto Manning, O.F.M. (1983.07.28 – 1996.10.09)
 Prelates of Coroico (Roman rite) 
 Bishop Tomás Roberto Manning, O.F.M. (1959.04.21 – 1983.07.28)

Auxiliary bishop
Juan Vargas Aruquipa (1992-1997), appointed Bishop here

See also
Roman Catholicism in Bolivia

References

External links
 GCatholic.org

Roman Catholic dioceses in Bolivia
Christian organizations established in 1958
Roman Catholic dioceses and prelatures established in the 20th century
Coroico, Roman Catholic Diocese of
1958 establishments in Bolivia